is a Japanese gravure idol, actress, and variety tarento. Kishi is represented by Stardust Promotion.

Life and career 
Kishi had carried out activities such as modelling in her birthplace at the Osaka area, and in March 2012 she moved to her current office and debuted with her current stage name. She was a chosen as a member of the Daiichi Shokai image girl unit D Dream Girls.

When Kishi appeared in "Hannari G Cup" in Sunday Japon her catchphrase is "Iyashikei Hannari Yōsai" (Healing Hannari Venus File).

In 2013 she appeared in an advertisement for Dororich Girls 2 of Glico co-starring with Anna Konno, Ayaka Sayama, Arisa, and Mizuki Hoshina.

Filmography

TV drama

TV series

Films

Advertisements

Internet

Image girl

Catalogues

Publications

DVD

Bibliography

Photobooks

References

External links 
  
 Official blog - Asuka Kishi 

Japanese gravure idols
1991 births
Living people
People from Osaka Prefecture
21st-century Japanese actresses